Mahmoud Samir is an Egyptian footballer, who plays as a midfielder for Egyptian Premier League club Al-Mokawloon al-Arab.

References

Egyptian footballers
Football (soccer) midfielders
Living people
Al Mokawloon Al Arab SC players
1985 births
Zamalek SC players
Egyptian Premier League players